An uttariya is a loose piece of upper body clothing. It is a single piece of cloth that falls from the back of the neck to curl around both arms and could also drape the top half of the body. An Uttariya is similar to a veil, a long scarf and shawl.  

The word uttarīya is from Sanskrit. Uttariya is the combination of Uttar (उत्तर) and suffix īya (ईय).

History 
Uttariya was a garment for upper body in vedic periods. (1500 and 500 BCE.) The garments worn in the Vedic period mainly included a single cloth wrapped around the whole body and draped over the shoulder. People used to wear the lower garment called paridhana which was pleated in front and used to tie with a belt called mekhala and an upper garment called Uttariya (covered like a shawl) which they used to remove during summers. "Orthodox males and females usually wore the uttariya by throwing it over the left shoulder only, in the style called upavita". There was another garment called pravara that they used to wear in cold. This was the general garb of both the sexes but the difference existed only in size of cloth and manner of wearing. Sometimes the poor people used to wear the lower garment as a loincloth only while the wealthy would wear it extending to the feet as a sign of prestige.

Mahabharata (compiled between 4th BC 4th AD) refers the use of Uttariya as a garment. Even the Indo-Aryan men and women used it. The colors of Uttariya were associated with distinct varna in society then. Pandavas were observed wearing white.  

Women were using two uttariya sometimes. One for covering the head another across the arms. Women used satanmasuska or Sattanapatta (also known as kurpsika or kanchuki) to cover their breasts. As per mention in Buddhist Pali literature during the 6th century BC,  Sari  is an evolved form of combining Sattanapatta, Uttariya and Antariya. 

It was usually made of fine cotton or silk, but can be suggested also with fine hide. 

Carvings that feature this garment date back a long way but there are few examples of this garment surviving so fashion historians study the reliefs.

Modern day use

Rituals in Hindu temples 
Like snana yatra of Jagannath, in many other hindu temples the deities are offered distinguished Bheshas as a part of worship. Priests grace the Gods with adequate clothing and jewelry. They use cloths Tadapa and Uttariya; the lower body's cloth is Tadapa, and Uttariya for the upper body.

Buddhist clothing 
Lay brothers of the Buddhist community would typically be dressed with the antriya, accompanied by an uttariya and a larger chadder, all colored in saffron.

Daily use 
Uttariya is still worn throughout Indian subcontinent and is traditionally worn over kurta, achkan or sherwani since classical age. It was usually used in combination with the antriya, an ancient version of the dhoti, held with a sash or kamarbandh. The uttariya could also be used as a dupatta, turban, by both men and women.

See also 

 Antariya
 Adivasah
 History of clothing in the Indian subcontinent
Pratidhi
 Sari
Stanapatta
Nivi (garment)

References 

Indian clothing
Hindu religious clothing
Buddhist religious clothing